The canton of Hénin-Beaumont is a former canton situated in the department of the Pas-de-Calais and in the Nord-Pas-de-Calais region of northern France. It was disbanded following the French canton reorganisation which came into effect in March 2015. It had a total of 22,187 inhabitants (2012).

Geography 
The canton is organised around Hénin-Beaumont in the arrondissement of Lens. The altitude varies from 22m (Noyelles-Godault) to 65m (Hénin-Beaumont) for an average altitude of 32m.

The canton comprised 2 communes:
Hénin-Beaumont (partly)
Noyelles-Godault

See also 
Cantons of Pas-de-Calais 
Communes of Pas-de-Calais 
Arrondissements of the Pas-de-Calais department

References

Henin-Beaumont
2015 disestablishments in France
States and territories disestablished in 2015